Charles Bruno Blondeau (March 22, 1835 – July 4, 1888) was a Canadian politician and contractor. He was elected to the House of Commons of Canada as a Member of the Conservative Party to represent the riding of Kamouraska in the 1882 election. He was defeated in the 1887 election.

The son of Antoine Blondeau and Angèle Lebel, he was educated in St. Pascal and at Sainte-Anne-de-la-Pocatière. In 1860, he married Adelaide Patry.

References

External links
 

1835 births
1888 deaths
Liberal Party of Canada MPs
Members of the House of Commons of Canada from Quebec